Hathor 1 - Coptic Calendar - Hathor 3

The second day of the Coptic month of Hathor, the third month of the Coptic year. On a common year, this day corresponds to October 29, of the Julian Calendar, and November 11, of the Gregorian Calendar. This day falls in the Coptic season of Peret, the season of emergence.

Commemorations

Saints 

 The martyrdom of Saint Macarius the Libyan 
 The departure of Pope Peter III, the twenty-seventh Patriarch of the See of Saint Mark 
 The departure of Saint Aframios of El-Raha

References 

Days of the Coptic calendar